Poing may refer to:

 "Poing" (song), a gabber style song
 Poing, Bavaria, a municipality in the district of Ebersberg, Bavaria, Germany